The Honolulu Rail Transit Project (also known as the Honolulu High-Capacity Transit Corridor Project) is a light metro system under construction in Honolulu County, Hawaii, U.S. The mostly elevated system features design elements from both heavy rail systems and light metros, with a commuter-rail-like design incorporated into trains and suburban stations. It will become the first large-scale publicly run metro system in the United States to feature platform screen doors and driverless trainsets. The first phase of the project, linking East Kapolei on the ʻEwa Plain and Aloha Stadium, is scheduled to open by July 2023. Its second phase continuing the line across urban Honolulu to the Ala Moana Center terminus is due to open in March 2031.

For more than 20 years, debate over the development of a rail system in Honolulu has been a major point of contention in local politics, especially leading into the 2008, 2012, and 2016 mayoral elections. Proponents of the system say it will alleviate worsening traffic congestion, already among the worst in the United States. They assert that the urban agglomeration in south Oahu is ideally suited to rail. In opposition, freeway advocate Panos Prevedouros questions its cost-effectiveness compared to "road widening or lane addition" and claims that it will have marginal impact on traffic congestion. Other groups object to its cost as well as paying for the line without it serving their neighborhoods.

The project is financed by a surcharge on local taxes as well as a $1.55 billion grant from the Federal Transit Administration (FTA). After major cost overruns, the tax surcharges were extended in 2016 by five years to raise another $1.2 billion; however that additional funding was only sufficient for construction out to Middle Street in Kalihi. The FTA stated that its contribution is contingent to completion of the line all the way to Ala Moana Center and will not be increased. After much wrangling, the state legislature in 2017 approved $2.4 billion in additional taxes to allow the city to complete the project according to the original plan. 

The process to award the contract for building the final  section through downtown Honolulu was suspended in 2015. The process was restarted in September 2017, and the first major contract for that section, estimated at $400 million, was awarded in May 2018.

The final cost has grown from preliminary projections of $4 billion in 2006 to as much as $12.4 billion by 2021. Critics have called for a "forensic audit" to establish the cause of the increase. The tax increase legislation passed in 2017 also requires the State auditor carry out an audit of the project's accounts and to consider alternatives for completing the system. The projected shortfall for the rail project is roughly $3 billion, with the completion date pushed back to 2031.

History
Plans for a mass-transit line to connect Honolulu's urban center with outlying areas began in the 1960s, but funding was not approved until 2005. The controversy over the rail line was the dominant issue for local politics leading into the 2008 Honolulu elections, and culminated in a city charter amendment which left the final decision to a direct vote of the citizens of Oahu. Construction of the rail line was approved with 53% of voters in favor, and ground broke on project construction on February 22, 2011.

Previous projects
For more than 50 years, some Honolulu politicians have attempted to construct a rail transit line. In 1966, then-mayor Neal S. Blaisdell suggested a rail line as a solution to alleviate traffic problems in Honolulu, stating, "Taken in the mass, the automobile is a noxious mechanism whose destiny in workaday urban use is to frustrate man and make dead certain that he approaches his daily occupation unhappy and inefficient."

Frank Fasi was elected to office in 1968, and started planning studies for a rail project, named Honolulu Area Rapid Transit (HART), in 1977. After Fasi lost the 1980 reelection to Eileen Anderson, President Ronald Reagan cut off funding for all upcoming mass transit projects, which led Anderson to cancel HART in 1981. Fasi defeated Anderson in their 1984 rematch and restarted the HART project in 1986, but this second effort was stopped in a 1992 vote by the Honolulu City Council against the necessary tax increase.

Fasi resigned in 1994 to run for governor, with Jeremy Harris winning the special election to replace him. Harris unsuccessfully pursued a bus rapid transit project as an interim solution until he left office in 2004. His successor, Mufi Hannemann, began the Honolulu High-Capacity Transit Corridor Project (HHCTCP), the island's fourth attempt to build a mass transit system operating in a dedicated right-of-way. 

Hannemann thought it was "prudent to move quickly" to show the FTA that Honolulu was committed to the HHCTCP. An environmental impact study had not been completed at the time of signing the first construction contract with Kiewit. The FTA needed a complete environmental impact statement before moving Honolulu forward in the grand-awarding process. Hannemann's urge to move fast in the project ultimately allowed stakeholders to delay some important foundational work such as the environmental impact study.

Studies

The City and County of Honolulu Department of Transportation Services released the first formal study related to the HHCTCP on November 1, 2006, the Alternatives Analysis Report. The report compared the cost and benefits of a "fixed guideway system", along with three alternatives. The first expanded the existing bus system to match population growth. A second option called for a further expansion to the bus system, with improvements to existing roads. The third alternative proposed a two-lane flyover above the H-1 freeway between Pearl City and Honolulu International Airport, continuing over Nimitz Highway, and into downtown Honolulu. The report recommended construction of the fixed guideway, and is considered the city's official justification for building a rail line.

A second planning document, the Draft Environmental Impact Statement (DEIS), studied possible natural and social impacts of the construction and operation of the HHCTCP. The DEIS was completed and cleared for public release by the Federal Transit Administration (FTA) on October 29, 2008. After minor changes were made to comply with state law, the document was distributed via the city's official project website four days later. The DEIS indicated that impacts of the rail project would include land acquisition from private owners on the route, displacement of residents and businesses, aesthetic concerns related to the elevated guideway, and noise from passing trains.

The city was criticized for timing the release only two days before the 2008 general election. City Councilmember Ann Kobayashi, running as a mayoral candidate against incumbent Hannemann, suggested that the city deliberately withheld key information to early voters who had already cast their ballots for the mayoral candidates, and a city charter amendment related to the project. The anti-rail advocacy group Stop Rail Now criticized the report for not further discussing bus rapid transit and toll lanes, options studied earlier by the city in its Alternatives Analysis.

The third and final official planning document, the Final Environmental Impact Statement (FEIS), was approved and cleared for public release by the FTA on June 14, 2010. The FEIS addresses and incorporates public comments received regarding the DEIS. The FTA subsequently declared the environmental review process complete in a record of decision issued on January 18, 2011.

Impact on Honolulu mayoral elections
The importance of the Honolulu High-Capacity Transit Corridor Project in the 2008 mayoral election led one observer to describe the vote as a "referendum on rail transit". Two challengers emerged as rivals to incumbent Mufi Hannemann: City Councilmember Ann Kobayashi and University of Hawaii professor Panos D. Prevedouros. Kobayashi supported a "rubber-tired" mass transit system, as opposed to the conventional steel-wheel-on-steel-rail system chosen by the Hannemann administration. Prevedouros, on the other hand, opposed any type of mass-transit project, favoring construction of a reversible tollway over the H-1, similar to the Managed Lane option which the Alternatives Analysis studied and rejected as unworkable, and reworking existing road systems to ease congestion. No candidate won a majority of votes in the September 20 non-partisan primary, forcing a runoff between Hannemann and Kobayashi; Hannemann successfully retained his post with 58% of the vote in the November 4 general election.

On April 22, 2008, the Stop Rail Now advocacy group announced their intent to file a petition with the city to place a question on the 2008 ballot to create an ordinance that read: "Honolulu mass transit shall not include trains or rail". Stop Rail Now attempted to submit the petition with 49,041 signatures to City Clerk Denise De Costa on August 5, but was initially denied after De Costa claimed the city charter did not allow the petition to be submitted less than 180 days before a general election, as the wording of the petition called for a special election. Stop Rail Now filed a lawsuit to force the city to accept the petition, and the courts ruled in Stop Rail Now's favor on August 14. Stop Rail Now's petition drive ultimately failed on September 4 when De Costa deemed only 35,056 of the signatures valid, well short of the 44,525 required.

In response to the possibility that Stop Rail Now's petition would fail, the City Council had however voted on August 21 to place a proposed amendment to the city charter on the ballot, asking voters to decide the fate of the project. Mayor Hannemann signed the proposal the following day. The City Council's proposed amendment was not intended to have a direct legal effect on the city's ability to continue the project, but was meant as a means for Oahu residents to express their opinions on its construction. The charter amendment was approved with 53% of votes cast in favor of rail and 47% against. Majorities of voters in Leeward and Central Oahu, the areas that will be served by the project, voted in favor of the amendment, while the majority of those living outside the project's scope in Windward Oahu and East Honolulu voted against it. In mid-2010, Hannemann resigned as mayor to run for governor and Kirk Caldwell assumed the position of interim mayor.

In the 2016 Honolulu mayoral election the main three candidates again took opposing views on rail. Honolulu City Council Member Charles Djou, former mayor Peter Carlisle, and incumbent Kirk Caldwell all ran for mayor with the stated goal of finishing rail. However, Republican Djou ran on drastically cutting spending on rail by cutting funding on buying cars on the rail before its completion, and hiring mainland consultants. Kirk Caldwell also stated that spending on rail should be cut, but instead by shortening the rail to end at Middle Street. Carlisle was the only candidate in support of funding the full rail system and stated that rail has gone too far to be stopped. Kirk Caldwell won the election, and promptly went on to adopt Carlisle's position that rail should be completed.

Delays and cost overruns
Construction on the HHCTCP rail line was originally scheduled to begin in December 2009 but did not occur on that date owing to delays in the project review process and delays in obtaining federal approval of the environmental impact statement.

In January 2010, Republican Governor Linda Lingle publicly recommended that the city alter plans for the rail line after news reports on FTA documents where the federal agency raised issues over declining tax revenues in connection with a global economic recession, and commissioned a study by the state to review the project's finances in March. The state financial study, publicly released on December 2, 2010, indicated that the project would likely experience a $1.7 billion overrun above the $5.3 billion projected cost, and that collections from the General Excise Tax would be 30% below forecasts. Then Mayor Peter Carlisle (Democrat) dismissed the study as "damaged goods," and "a pre-determined anti-rail rant." He also pointed to several conclusions as "erroneous" and "inaccurate" before concluding that "spending a third of a million dollars for this shoddy, biased analysis is an appalling waste of our tax dollars." Lingle's Democratic successor, Neil Abercrombie, publicly stated that the financial analysis would not affect his decision to approve or disapprove of the project, saying that the state's responsibility is limited to the environmental review process, and that decisions regarding the project's finances belong to the city and the FTA. Governor Abercrombie subsequently approved the project's final environmental impact statement on December 16, 2010. The Honolulu City Council held a hearing on January 12, 2011, about the state's financial review, but the hearing was not attended by any state officials, who had been invited to testify.

On January 18, 2011, the FTA issued a "record of decision", indicating that the HHCTCP had met the requirements of its environmental review and that the city was allowed to begin construction work on the project. The record of decision allowed the city to begin negotiating with owners of land that will be purchased for the project, to begin relocating utility lines to make way for construction of the line and stations, and to purchase rolling stock for the rail line. A ground-breaking ceremony was held on February 22, 2011, in Kapolei, at the site of the future East Kapolei station along Kualakai Parkway.

In March 2012, Dan Grabauskas was hired on a three-year contract as CEO and executive director of HART. In 2014 HART CEO Dan Grabauskas blamed lawsuits, launched in 2011, for some of the cost overruns after bids to construct the first nine stations exceeded the budget by $100 million. His claims were disputed by the plaintiffs in one of the cases who said HART could have put the stations out to tender and that HART had deliberately delayed the legal proceedings so a judgement would only be delivered after a significant proportion of the line had been completed.

Testing and more delays
Interim service over the first ten miles of the line, between East Kapolei and Aloha Stadium, was scheduled to commence in October 2020. However, complications due to the COVID-19 pandemic pushed the start date back by three months. By November 2020, the opening had again slipped to late 2021 due to delays in testing equipment.

In December 2020, HART discovered early wear on the track crossings, or "frogs". It was later determined that the trains' wheel flanges were approximately  narrower at the frogs, thus affecting the driverless trains' ability to safely navigate certain track crossings at the speeds needed to operate on schedule. During investigation, subpar welding and sandblasting-inducted cracks were also discovered. In November 2021, Roger Morton, director of Honolulu's Department of Transportation Services, stated that a required three months of field testing and certification (to be carried out by Hitachi) was scheduled to begin in January 2022.

In December 2021, it was decided that temporary welding fixes would be made to allow the trains to run at operational speeds despite the narrower wheels, with plans to swap out wheels with wider ones during future maintenance work. An initial call searching for contractors to perform the manganese welding work failed to return any bids. Due to the lack of local companies able to complete the work, the state's Department of Commerce and Consumer Affairs granted HART an exemption allowing mainland contractors to be hired.

Burial issues
Like most major infrastructure work in Hawaii, construction of the rail line is likely to uncover historic human remains, notably in its downtown Honolulu section. The Oahu Island Burial Council (part of the State Historic Preservation Division, within the State of Hawaii Department of Land and Natural Resources) refused to sign a programmatic agreement on October 21, 2009, over concerns about likely burial sites located along the line's proposed route over Halekauwila Street in Kakaako. Three construction projects in the area since 2002 have each encountered unforeseen human remains that led to delays, and archaeologist Thomas Dye stated, "The council is absolutely right that you should expect to find burials on Halekauwila Street".

The Burial Council's core contention was the city's decision to conduct an archaeological survey of the rail line's route in phases, meaning construction on a majority of the line will be complete by the time the survey in the Kakaako area is performed, which in turn increases the likelihood that any remains discovered will be moved instead of being allowed to remain in situ. In response to the Burial Council's concerns, the city agreed to begin conducting an archaeological survey of the area in 2010, two years earlier than originally planned. The state Department of Land and Natural Resources later signed the city's programmatic agreement on January 15, 2011, over the continuing concerns of the Burial Council.

The city's decision to conduct the archaeological survey in phases subsequently led to a lawsuit filed on February 1, 2011, by the Native Hawaiian Legal Corporation on behalf of cultural practitioner Paulette Kaleikini. The suit, which named both the city and the State of Hawaii as defendants, contended that state law requires the full length of the rail line to have an archaeological survey conducted before any construction takes place, and seeks to void the environmental impact statement and all construction permits issued for the project. Kaleikini's lawyers filed on February 18 a request for an injunction to stop work on the project until the case is resolved. The suit was initially dismissed on March 23, 2011, after Circuit Court Judge Gary Chang ruled that state and federal laws allow the archaeological surveys to be conducted in phases. Kaleikini's lawyers subsequently appealed to the Hawaii Supreme Court, which heard oral arguments in the case on May 24, 2012. The court ruled on August 24, 2012, that it agreed with plaintiff Kaleikini that the archaeological survey needed to be completed before construction could take place, and that the State Historic Preservation Division did not comply with state law when it approved the project. The case has now been remanded to Circuit Court. On December 27, 2012, the United States District Court for the District of Hawaii granted the plaintiffs' injunction, and ordered that all construction-related activities in segment 4 of the archaeological survey be halted until compliance with the Hawaii Supreme Court decision made earlier this year is met. This ruling does not affect construction activities in the first three segments, nor does it affect construction planning, design, or engineering in segment 4, which is the final segment to be built. The Phase 4 area encompasses the downtown area and its immediate environs, including Chinatown, Mother Waldron Park, and Beretania Street. Judge Tashima, the only sitting judge on the case, ruled on condition of the injunction that the city is required to file periodic status updates on their compliance with the judgment. The injunction will then terminate 30 days after defendants file a notice of final compliance.

Social impact
The development of this project has been a point of contention among environmental, indigenous, and residential interest groups, as the United States Department of Transportation is accountable for nationwide compliance with Title VI of the Civil Rights Act of 1964. Specifically, residents of the North Shore, Wai‘anae Coast, and Central and East regions of Oahu, home to mostly middle and lower-class communities, but also those of mostly upper class Hawaii Kai, Kahala, and Windward Oahu, pay the higher excise tax without reaping the direct benefits of the Rail Transit project. Indigenous Hawaiians constitute large percentages of the communities scattered along the southwest coast of the island, where residents generally exist under the national poverty line, but the project may possibly serve wealthier, "local" Hawaiian residents while bypassing the poorer indigenous Hawaiian community. Numerous studies have identified various benefits, including increased home values and increased median household income, that fall upon residences located near a rail transit station; public transit implementation thus constitutes a measure of public and private investment in a community.

Financing

Initial General Excise Tax (GET) surcharge

After winning the 2004 election, Hannemann announced that construction of a rail line was an administration priority. The following May and upon prompting by the city, the Hawaii State Legislature passed a bill (Act 247) to allow counties a one-half percent increase in the Hawaii General Excise Tax (GET), from 4% to 4.5%, to fund transportation projects. According to the bill, increased revenue would be delivered to counties implementing the raised tax to fund general public transportation infrastructure throughout Hawaii, and to pay for mass transit in the case of the City and County of Honolulu. Money collected from the initial 4% GET would remain state revenue.

Republican governor Linda Lingle initially threatened to veto the bill, believing that money destined for county governments should be collected by the individual counties. After compromising with legislative leaders and Mayor Hannemann, however, she allowed the bill to become law. On July 12, 2005, the bill was enacted as Act 247 of the Session Laws of Hawaii 2005, without the Governor's signature. A month later, the Honolulu City Council authorized the one-half percent GET increase, and Hannemann signed the measure into law on August 24. Act 247 required Honolulu to use the funds only for the construction and operation of a mass transit system, and barred its use for public roads and other existing transit systems, such as TheBus. Since no other county authorized the excise tax increase before the deadline of December 31, 2005, the Hawaii GET remains at 4% for Hawaii's three other counties. The increase went into effect on January 1, 2007, and was due to expire on December 31, 2022.

The Legislature considered a bill in the 2009 legislative session that would have redirected income from the half-percent increase back to the state to offset a $1.8 billion projected shortfall in the following three fiscal years. The bill was opposed by Mayor Hannemann and other city leaders who believed that redirecting the money would jeopardize federal funding for the project, and was eventually dropped after U.S. Senator Daniel Inouye indicated to the Legislature that he shared the city's concerns.

GET surchange extensions and "Hotel Tax" surcharge
In January 2016, the Council extended the GET for another five years to add $1.2 billion in funding to cover a budget blowout. The council also required that the money raised by the extension go into a contingency fund and to pay for disability access to the system. HART was required to provide quarterly financial reports to the council.

On September 1, 2017, the Legislature, after meeting for a week in a special session on rail financing, approved further taxes to raise $2.4 billion for the project. The taxes include a further three-year extension to the 0.5 percent General Excise Tax surcharge, which will now expire in 2030, and a thirteen-year, 1.0 percent surcharge on the existing 9.25 percent statewide Transient Accommodation Tax (TAT) which is charged to tourists.  Efforts to pass a funding bill in May 2017 had failed and the impetus for the special session was a FTA deadline of September 15 for a funding plan to cover the shortfall. The bill also grants the state government oversight over the project including the appointment of two non-voting representatives on the HART board and calls for an audit of HART by the state auditor. It was signed into law by the governor on September 5.

Federal Transit Administration's request for recovery plan
In mid 2016, the FTA requested that HART develop a "recovery plan" by August 7, 2016. Also in June a separate report by Jacobs Engineering, the project management contractor, said under a worst-case scenario the final cost would $10.79 billion.

In January 2017, a group called "Salvage the Rail" published a plan, based on Option 2A from six alternatives proposed by the FTA to HART in 2016, that would terminate the elevated section at Middle Street and run at street level to the terminus along a route one block inland from the HART plan. The system would need to be reconfigured to use new driver-operated low floor vehicles, lowering the platforms on the stations already constructed. Proponents say it would save $3 billion and four years of construction, as well as avoid disturbing burial sites under the downtown area.

After a lodgement extension was granted by the FTA, HART submitted its recovery plan in April 2017 which concluded that completion of the original 21 station route was the only viable option. An alternative "Plan B" to build only 14 stations within the already funded $6.5 billion budget, was ruled out because of lower ridership, legal risks, insufficient contingency and other reasons. The new project cost was $8.165 billion with media reports indicating that after financing charges are included it could be over $10 billion. An updated schedule for opening said the section from East Kapolei to Aloha Stadium will open at the end of 2020 and operation of the full route by December 2025.

In September 2017, HART submitted an updated recovery plan to the FTA with a new estimate price of $9.02 billion. The plan still includes $8.165 billion in construction costs, but has reduced financing costs of $858 million following state legislation granting both prolonged and new taxes to fund the project. The State Auditor has been tasked to consider alternatives for completing the system, as part of its audit of HART. As of January 2018 the FTA has not formally accepted the new recovery plan but has asked HART for more details including how it came up with its tax-revenue forecasts.

In February 2019, the FTA served HART with two subpoenas. The first asked the agency to send investigators documents relating to its real estate acquisition program. HART said some of the documents show it overspent on relocating residents and businesses along the rail route, which may have cost up to $4 million. The second sought the minutes from all board of directors meetings from 2011 through 2018, including the board-members’ private discussions in executive sessions.

In September 2019, the FTA accepted the recovery plan.

Route

The project constructs an almost entirely elevated rapid transit line from the eastern edge of Kapolei, near the University of Hawaiʻi – West Oʻahu campus, to Ala Moana Center (East of Honolulu downtown). The line passes through communities along southern Oahu, via Honolulu International Airport and downtown Honolulu. It will have twenty-one stations and run from Kapolei to Honolulu, passing through Waipahu, Pearl City, Waimalu, Aiea, and Halawa. The only at-grade trackage is a  section near Leeward Community College. Originally, the line was to fork near Aloha Stadium into two routes, one passing further south via Honolulu International Airport, and the other through Salt Lake, before reuniting at Middle Street in Kalihi. The city council initially decided to build the Salt Lake route before the airport route, as a result of horse-trading with City Councilmember Romy Cachola, whose constituents included Salt Lake residents and whose vote was needed to pass the decision. After the city charter amendment on rail transit passed, the City Council reconsidered the decision, and decided to re-route the rail line to pass by Pearl Harbor and the airport, without a Salt Lake alignment. The airport route is 4% more expensive, but is expected to have significantly higher ridership since it will ferry workers to both the airport and the Pearl Harbor military base.

In 2016, the western portion of the line ( – ) was scheduled to open in late 2020, and the full line ( – ) in late 2025. In March 2021, this latter date was pushed back to 2031. The project is divided into four segments or sections, with overlapping construction periods and expected revenue service dates.

When complete, the trains will carry more than 6,000 people per hour, from 4 am to midnight. It is estimated the trains will serve 119,600 daily riders. Passengers will use the HOLO card smart card to purchase fares, and the card will facilitate transfers to TheBus.

The long-term plan includes four extensions: two extensions east of Ala Moana Shopping Center, to the University of Hawaiʻi at Mānoa campus and to Waikiki, one extension west from East Kapolei to Kalaeloa, and the link through Salt Lake which was dropped from the initial plans. In 2010, it was estimated the extensions could be completed after the initial four-section project, possibly as early as 2030. None of these extensions is currently funded, but in November 2017, the rail authority took a first step towards preserving a corridor for the extension between Ala Moana Center and the University of Hawaiʻi at Mānoa.

Design

Farrington and Kamehameha segments

The stations were tendered separately.

The construction of the rail line started from suburban areas in Kapolei and Ewa, and progresses east towards the urban center in Honolulu. There will be 112 columns from East Kapolei to Ewa. The choice to start from Kapolei was made because the first phase must include a baseyard for trains, which is more cheaply built away from the center, and also because the city chose to delay construction in the urban center to later phases of the project due to associated major impacts to existing infrastructure and unpopular traffic delays.

To speed construction, the elevated trackway is built using precast concrete box girder bridge segments. This method was first used for MARTA in the 1980s. The trackway was designed by FIGG Bridge Engineers (who were responsible for the superstructure, referring to the box girder segmental bridge) and HNTB (substructure, referring to the columns).

Casting of the box girder segments began in 2014 at a rate of 13 segments per day; in total, 5,238 segments will be required for the first  phase. The segments are cast locally in Kalaeloa. Once the piers were erected, a pier bracket ram was placed and a launching gantry was used to bridge the span between adjacent piers; a deck-mounted crane lifted the precast segments onto the gantry, which supported them while they were tensioned together. In total, 430 of the 438 spans in Phase 1 were assembled using precast box girder segments, at an average rate of 1 to 2 days per span.

For the eight long spans required to bridge the / Waiawa interchange in Pearl City, a balanced cantilever construction method was used instead. This covers the segments from Pier 252 to Pier 256. Instead of precast segments, Kiewit used segments cast in-place, starting from the piers set in the freeway medians and working towards adjacent piers. The yellow-painted traveling forms at each end were used to cast each segment, then moved to the fresh end to cast the next segment. The final pour for the balanced cantilever was performed in September 2016.

Airport segment

The third section of the route to be completed will be the  Airport section east from Aloha Stadium to Middle Street. It includes four stations, including the Honolulu International Airport station. AECOM won the contract to design the Airport section in 2012 with a $38.8 million bid. The construction contract was awarded to a joint venture of Shimmick-Traylor-Granite (STGJV) in August 2016, who bid $874.8 million; construction started in December 2016.

The Airport section consists of 214 total spans. Like the earlier Farrington and Kamehameha sections, they are constructed using precast concrete box girder bridge segments, but for the Airport section, the segments are lifted and supported by an overhead gantry crane while they are tensioned. Both a conventional overhead gantry and an articulating gantry are being used during the guideway assembly. More than 2700 precast segments are required for the Airport section, which also includes more than 230 columns for the piers and 5400 permanent sound walls. This was believed to have established a new record for a drilled shaft caisson. The column, in Kalihi Stream on Kamehameha Highway between Middle Street and Puuhale Road, will be part of the support for Kahauiki station.

The STGJV announced in December 2020 it had completed the last of the 2,708 precast concrete guideway segments for the Airport section, with this last segment scheduled to be installed over Ualena Street near Lagoon Drive in spring 2021. The lower height is used in several places along the Airport section to accommodate overhead clearances and flight path restrictions.

City Center segment
It is estimated the City Center section will cost $1.6 billion to complete. Under the proposed PPP, the City Center section would be procured under a design-build-finance-operate-maintain (DBFOM) contract, which would award the successful bidder the right to operate and maintain the entire system for a period of 25 years after completing the City Center section. The City of Honolulu would retain oversight over operations and maintenance, public information, and responsibility for fare vending and enforcement. A contract for $400 million to clear utilities in the City Center section was awarded in May 2018.

HART issued a request for proposals (RFP) for the DBFOM contract for the City Center Guideway and Stations section in late 2018 and announced it had received proposals from several bidders by July 2020. However, the bids for the construction of the City Center Guideway and Stations significantly exceeded HART's cost estimates, at $2.7 billion compared to the $1.4 billion estimate, and HART officially discontinued pursuing a PPP approach to completing the City Center section in November 2020. The bids for the operation and maintenance portion of the contract (ranging from $4.2 to $5.3 billion) were closer to the estimate ($4.95 billion). On December 14, 2020, HART issued a request for information, asking for input from the construction industry for the best way to structure a RFP that would receive realistic bids.

Stations
The STGJV were awarded the contract to build the four Airport section stations (and ) as part of their $875 million contract for the Airport section.

The Hawaiian Station Naming Working Group (HSNWG), an expert working group, was named by the Honolulu City Council Resolution 09–158 on April 29, 2009, to develop Hawaiian names for each station of the Honolulu Authority for Rapid Transportation (HART) system. HSNWG proposed Hawaiian names for the nine rail stations on the Ewa end of the rail system (stations west of and including Aloha Stadium) in November 2017, and HART adopted the proposed names on February 22, 2018. On April 17, 2019, HART released a list of Hawaiian names proposed by HSNWG for the remaining 12 rail stations on the eastern end of the rail system, between Pearl Harbor and Ala Moana Center. The 12 names were released for public comment, and the HSNWG will review comments before presenting a final list of names to the HART Board of Directors.

List of stations

Rail Operations Center

The Rail Operations Center (ROC; also known as the Maintenance and Storage Facility) is the  railyard, operations, and maintenance facility, divided into four buildings. The design has been awarded LEED Silver certification.

The buildings on the ROC campus are:
Operation & Servicing Building (OSB) – housing primary vehicle maintenance facilities and the Operations and Control Center, where operators will monitor and control vehicle movement
Maintenance of Way Building (MOW) – housing equipment used to inspect and repair tracks
Train Wash Facility (TWF) – an automated facility to clean vehicle exteriors
Wheel Truing Building (WTB) – a maintenance facility for vehicle wheels

The contract for the ROC was awarded to the Kiewit/Kobayashi Joint Venture in 2011. The contract was initially awarded at a cost of $195 million; when the ROC was completed in July 2016, the actual incurred costs were $274 million.

Rolling stock

Although several other technologies were considered, including rubber tired, maglev and monorail, then Mayor Mufi Hannemann had already decided that it would be steel on steel or nothing at all.  “I will not put this city in a position of financial disaster," said Hannemann. "I'll pull the plug. If it's not 'steel on steel,' I'll pull the plug." The line will use  four-car train sets, each with the capacity to carry about 780 passengers, similar in weight to light rail systems elsewhere in the United States (such as the MAX in Portland, Oregon), as opposed to heavier, and thus more expensive, lines found on rapid transit systems like the subways and elevated systems of Chicago and New York City. However, the stations will be standalone structures and will be substantially bigger than typical light rail stations. Physically, the Honolulu system will have a good deal in common with light rapid-transit systems such as SkyTrain in Vancouver, British Columbia or the Copenhagen Metro, as well as the Docklands Light Railway in London. The system will be the first metro system in the United States to feature platform gates and will be driverless. Rolling stock for the line will initially include 80 cars in 20 four-car train sets. 
The cars will be powered by a third-rail electrification system.

Contract and delivery
The contract for the rail cars (named the Core Systems Design-Build-Operate-Maintain Services contract) was signed on November 28, 2011, by HART and Ansaldo Honolulu, a joint venture between Hitachi Rail Italy (initially AnsaldoBreda) and Hitachi Rail STS (initially Ansaldo STS). AnsaldoBreda and Ansaldo STS previously collaborated on the construction and operation of vehicles for the Copenhagen Metro and the Brescia Metro. Both companies were later purchased by Hitachi Rail in 2015 and Ansaldo Honolulu was subsequently renamed to Hitachi Rail Honolulu (HRH). Under the $1.4 billion contract, HRH is responsible for designing and fabricating the rail cars ($574 million), a test to validate train performance ($167 million), and operations and maintenance (O&M) during the first five years of revenue service ($339 million), with an option to continue O&M services for HART for an additional five years ($318 million) provided the review of the first five years is favorable.

The two unsuccessful bidders for the rail-car contract, Bombardier Transportation and Sumitomo Corporation of America, filed protests over the award. Both protests were rejected during the administrative process, but Bombardier sought judicial review of their bid protest. The administrative decision against Bombardier's protest was affirmed by both the state Circuit Court and the Intermediate Court of Appeals.

The first two cars arrived in Hawaii in March 2016, and the first train was unveiled to the public at the Rail Operations Center on May 2, 2016. To meet "Buy America" requirements for federally-subsidized transit projects, the bodyshells are fabricated at the Hitachi Rail Italy plant in Reggio Calabria, Italy, then shipped to HRI's Pittsburg, California plant for final assembly. The Pittsburg factory has since been partially leased to Bombardier Rail, who will assemble cars for BART there.

In December 2016, Hitachi Rail Italy reported defects were discovered in the welds in the extruded aluminum beams of twenty-seven car shells, four of which were already in Hawaii. The manufacturer will fix the problems, but warned delivery may be delayed as production of new vehicles will be halted. In March 2017 HART said they would meet the interim opening needs after repair of the defective cars and that full opening would not be affected.

In May 2017, trains were towed on tracks in Honolulu for the first time, to check clearances. Testing of trains under their own power commenced in October 2017.

Timeline of progress
February 2006 – A draft transportation plan includes $2.5 billion for a fixed-rail system between Kapolei and Manoa.
June 2006 – Officials estimate the infrastructure construction cost at estimated at $3 billion, $200 million more than a previous estimate, for a 24-mile system. This does not include the cost of the trains.
January 2007 – The General Excise Tax (GET) within Honolulu County is increased by 0.5% with the extra funds earmarked for a mass transit system. The increase was set to expire on December 31, 2022.
February 2007 – The City Council approves the Minimum Operating Segment from East Kapolei to Ala Moana Centre, via Salt Lake Boulevard.
October 2008 – The Draft Environmental Impact Statement (DEIS) is released to the public. The projected cost is $3.7 billion including $1 billion for contingencies.
November 2008 – Fifty three percent of voters support an measures to give the Honolulu City Council authority to proceed with "establishment of a steel wheel on steel rail transit system". The estimated cost is $4 billion.
January 2009 – The middle portion of the route between Aloha Stadium and Middle Street is amended to have stations at the Pearl Harbor Naval Base and the Honolulu Airport which had one of the original options. The previous route followed Salt Lake Boulevard.
June 2010 – The Final Environmental Impact Statement (FEIS) is released to the public. Estimated cost is $5.5 billion. Patronage by 2030 is projected to be 116,300 riders per day.
December 2010 – A report, commissioned by outgoing Governor Lingle, is released which warns the project could cost at least $1.7 billion more than the city's projected $5.5 billion price tag.
March 2012 – Dan Grabauskas becomes executive director and CEO of HART on a three-year contract. He takes his position in April 2012.
May 2012 – Construction workers started pouring concrete on the foundations that will hold the rail columns.
December 2012 – Honolulu City Council and the Federal Transit Authority (FTA) sign agreement for the project with a budget of $5.12 billion including $1.55 billion provided by the Federal Government. Full system revenue service is projected for January 31, 2020.
September 2014 – HART canceled the initial tender for the first nine stations after the bids were higher than budget. "The lowest bid by Nan, Inc. came in at $294.5 million, or $110 million more than the $184 million the transit authority had budgeted." The first trips on the railway are expected to be delayed, probably until 2018.
November 2015 – FTA withholds payment of a $250 million allotment until the council could show it had sufficient funding to complete the project.
January 2016 – Five year extension to the General Excise Tax surcharge adopted to add $1.2 billion in funding.
May 2016 – HART chairwoman Colleen Hanabusa shared a confidential document detailing budget estimates as of March 1, 2016, showing that the rail project is expected to cost $6.9 billion.
April 2016 – An audit of the project by the City criticized HART for using outdated financial figures and budgets, lack of documentation for "change orders", and warned the HART estimates of the cost overruns were unreliable. HART officials disputed the audit's findings.
May 2016 – The FTA revealed that they estimate the total cost as $8.1 billion for the  line. In addition completion of the rail system would be delayed nearly five years until December 2024, versus HART's federal funding agreement stating that full line service from East Kapolei to Ala Moana Center would start in January 2020.
June 2016 – Report from Jacobs Engineering, the project management oversight contractor, says that under a worst-case scenario the final cost would $10.79 billion.
August 2016 – Dan Grabauskas resigns as CEO and executive director of HART but will be the official CEO until October 2016. From August until October, the Department of Transportation Service Director Mike Formby served as interim CEO.
October 2016 – Krishniah N. Murthy named interim CEO and executive director of HART and served in this position until December 2017.
April 2017 – HART sent a "Recovery Plan" to the FTA which concluded that completion of the original 21 station route was the only viable plan. The new project cost given is $8.165 billion with media reports indicating that after financing costs are included it will be over $10 billion. Opening of part of the system, from East Kapolei to Aloha Stadium, is scheduled for the end of 2020 with final completion of the full route by December 2025. The project is reported to be 36 percent complete as of March 2017.
July 2017 – Andrew Robbins named new CEO and executive director of HART at a base salary of $317,000, replacing interim CEO and Executive Director Krishniah N. Murthy in December 2017.
September 2017 – A new law is enacted to extend and increase taxes to raise an additional $2.4 billion for the project. The GET surcharge is extended by three years to 2030 (generating about $1 billion) and a surcharge of one percent is placed on the statewide hotel room tax for 13 years (generating $1.3 billion). HART submits a new recovery plan to the FTA with an estimated final cost of $9.02 billion with savings attributed to reduced financing costs given the new taxes.
January 2020 – Andrew Robbins, executive director and CEO of the Honolulu Authority for Rapid Transportation, said the first 10 miles of the Honolulu rail system would be completed by December 2020 as predicted, and will also be ready to run passenger service between Kapolei and Aloha Stadium three months earlier, by October 20, 2020. Robbins said he was so confident of the new date that he was willing to stick his neck out.
May 2020 – "Completion of the first 10-mile segment of the line from East Kapolei to Aloha Stadium, originally scheduled for October, will be delayed by about eight weeks, according to Honolulu Authority for Rapid Transportation executive director Andrew Robbins... And the city, which had forecast opening the line to riders by December, has pushed that date back to next March."
June 2020 – "More recently, the FTA has been projecting the project would be finished in September 2026, and insisted that the city incorporate that later date into its 2019 rail 'recovery plan.'"
July 2020 – The city finally received much-anticipated proposals from private industry to finish the project’s major remaining construction work and then run the system for its first 30 years. The bids won’t be publicly released until the contract is awarded by unidentified officials.
September 2020 – one of the PPP bidders for the final city center segment from Middle Street to Ala Moana Center revealed themselves during a recent quarterly earnings call. Ronald Tutor, CEO of Tutor Perini, disclosed that his company is part of the Tutor Perini / Parsons joint venture for the final segment of Honolulu rail. While HART estimated that this last stretch would cost $1.4 billion, Tutor stated that his company’s bid was “over $2 billion.”
October 2020 – “The estimated cost of rail has jumped once again, bringing the construction and interest tab to the $10 billion threshold. The mayor tells us it will probably grow more, and the shortfall to pay for it all now tops more than $1.2 billion.”
November 2020 – In an effort to keep $250 million in federal funding from lapsing at the end of the year, Mayor Kirk Caldwell bypassed HART CEO Andrew Robbins and sent a letter to the Federal Transit Authority requesting a one-year extension through the end of 2021. A rough outline of a plan included in the letter suggested a total cost of $11.2 billion including approximately $1 billion in financing costs, and a completion date of 2033.
March 2021 – Under new leadership, HART announces an updated, official completion date of 2031, with revenue service on the initial segment from Kapolei to Aloha Stadium beginning by the end of 2022.
April 2022 – HART announces tight gage and weld modifications have been completed, with final 90-day trial tunning testing to begin in the summer.
August 2022 – HART begins the 90 day trial testing phase.

In popular culture
In the 2014 American film Godzilla the MUTO monster attacks and destroys a train and a viaduct of the Honolulu Rail Transit.

References

External links

 
Transportation in Honolulu
Rail transport articles in need of updating
Rail transportation in Hawaii
Passenger rail transportation in Hawaii
2023 in rail transport
750 V DC railway electrification
Rail infrastructure under construction
Standard gauge railways in the United States